Phil Lavelle (born 1981 in Liverpool, UK) is an English TV news presenter and correspondent. He is currently with  CGTN America where he works as their Los Angeles Correspondent.

Career
Lavelle was a trainee journalist with Granada Television, before joining ITV Tyne Tees. He worked as a Programme Editor for two years, as part of the launch-team for the Al Jazeera English news service bureau in London.

He is a former Entertainment Correspondent for Sky News and a news correspondent and weekend presenter for Five News. He also had a spell as news correspondent and presenter for BBC London News. In 2010, Lavelle was hired by the BBC national network as a news correspondent for BBC Breakfast.

At Al Jazeera English, he became an established correspondent in Europe and the Near East. He reported from: the United Kingdom, France, the Netherlands, Poland, Italy, Cyprus, and Israel & Palestine. In the autumn of 2014, he was featured in the strand 'Al Jazeera Correspondent', with his self-produced documentary, 'My Digital Addiction'.

Personal life
He is gay and married, with two children, and is a keen fitness fan and gym goer. Lavelle currently resides in Bel Air, Los Angeles.

References

External links
Phil Lavelle Twitter

Living people
BBC newsreaders and journalists
English television journalists
ITV regional newsreaders and journalists
Sky News newsreaders and journalists
5 News presenters and reporters
1981 births